Rhandy Piñango (born 29 November 1971) is a Venezuelan telenovela, film and theater actor.

Biography
Piñango was born in Caracas at the Maternidad Concepción Palacios hospital, being the only son to parents José de Jesús Piñango and Mariela Pinto.

When he was a teenager, Piñango became attracted to drama and acting. After finishing his high school education at the Liceo Leopoldo Aguerrevere, he enrolled in acting classes at RCTV's acting school Luz Columba, under the instruction of professor Nelson Ortega. His first television role was in the telenovela La Llaman Mariamor in 1996.

After acting in various RCTV telenovelas, Piñango moved to Venevisión in 2005 to participate in the telenovela El amor las vuelve locas. In 2011, he played the role of a villain in the telenovela El árbol de Gabriel.

Filmography

Theater
 Historias de Cerro Arriba  
 Cada Batman Tiene su Robin
 O Todos o Ninguno
 Los Peces del Acuario
 Romero y Julieta
 Apartamento de Soltero

References

External links
 
 Rhandy Piñango @ Zetaboards.com
 Rhandy Piñango disfruta de la versatilidad de sus personajes @ Magazine.com.ve

1971 births
Living people
Male actors from Caracas
20th-century Venezuelan male actors
Venezuelan male telenovela actors
Venezuelan male film actors
Venezuelan male stage actors